János Petroczy is a Hungarian sprint canoeist who competed from the late 1950s to the late 1960s. He won three medals at the ICF Canoe Sprint World Championships with two silvers (K-4 1000 m: 1958, K-4 10000 m: 1966) and a bronze (K-4 10000 m: 1963).

References

Hungarian male canoeists
Living people
Year of birth missing (living people)
ICF Canoe Sprint World Championships medalists in kayak
20th-century Hungarian people